is the seventh compilation album by Japanese entertainer Miho Nakayama. Released through King Records on Nakayama's birthday of March 1, 1995, the album compiles her singles from 1991 to 1994, including her Japanese-language cover of Mariah Carey's "Hero". The popularity of the million-selling songs "Sekaijū no Dare Yori Kitto" and "Tada Nakitaku Naru no" helped boost the album's sales.

The album peaked at No. 3 on Oricon's albums chart. It sold over 590,000 copies and was certified Platinum by the RIAJ, becoming Nakayama's biggest-selling album in her career.

Track listing

Charts
Weekly charts

Year-end charts

Certification

References

External links
 
 
 

1995 compilation albums
Miho Nakayama compilation albums
Japanese-language compilation albums
King Records (Japan) compilation albums